These are the results of the diving competition at the 1975 World Aquatics Championships, which took place in Cali, Colombia.

Medal table

Medal summary

Men

Women

1975 World Aquatics Championships
Diving at the World Aquatics Championships